The Wade-Heerwagen House is a historic house at 338 North Washington Avenue. in Fayetteville, Arkansas.  It is a two-story wood-frame structure, built in the 1870s in imitation of pre-Civil War houses more typical of late-18th century Virginia.  The house is T-shaped, with a front section three bays wide that has a two-story porch extending across its width, and a rear ell added after the house's initial construction.  Its interior includes the first bathtub installed in Fayetteville.

The house was listed on the National Register of Historic Places in 1978.

See also
National Register of Historic Places listings in Washington County, Arkansas

References

Houses on the National Register of Historic Places in Arkansas
Houses completed in 1873
Houses in Fayetteville, Arkansas
National Register of Historic Places in Fayetteville, Arkansas